Abdoul Karim Conté (born 25 August 1999) is a Guinean footballer who plays for Austrian club St. Pölten.

Club career
On 14 August 2021, he signed a two-year contract with St. Pölten.

References

1999 births
Living people
Guinean footballers
Association football midfielders
JK Tallinna Kalev players
FC Wacker Innsbruck (2002) players
SKN St. Pölten players
Meistriliiga players
Austrian Football Bundesliga players
2. Liga (Austria) players
Guinean expatriate footballers
Expatriate footballers in Estonia
Guinean expatriate sportspeople in Estonia
Expatriate footballers in Austria
Guinean expatriate sportspeople in Austria